The George Wendt Show is an American sitcom television series that aired on CBS from March 8 to April 12, 1995. Based on the public radio show Car Talk, the series was a star vehicle for George Wendt after co-starring in the NBC sitcom Cheers throughout its run.  However, the series was a ratings failure and was canceled after six episodes aired, out of the eight episodes produced.

Premise
The series revolved around George and Dan Coleman (George Wendt and Pat Finn), two wise cracking brothers who own a car garage in Madison, Wisconsin. In addition to running the garage, they were also hosts of "Points and Plugs": a call-in radio show about car repair. However, the brothers would mostly get caught up in a number of crazy situations unrelated to cars. For instance, there was an episode focused on George having an itchy rash, a Halloween episode where George confronts the spirit of his Uncle Lou, and another having the brothers chaperone a high school prom.

Cast
 George Wendt as George Coleman
 Pat Finn as Dan Coleman
 Brian Doyle-Murray as Finnie
 Kate Hodge as Libby Schuster
 Mark Christopher Lawrence as Fletcher Williams

Episodes

References

External links

1990s American sitcoms
1995 American television series debuts
1995 American television series endings
CBS original programming
English-language television shows
Television series by ABC Studios
Television shows set in Madison, Wisconsin